Kupusovići is a village in the municipality of Višegrad, Bosnia and Herzegovina.

History
In Chuck Sudetic's book Blood and Vengeance, he relates a folk tale regarding the naming of the town. During Ottoman control of Bosnia, a Hodža was leading Muslims in afternoon prayer when he began yelling about a cow in a nearby cabbage patch. After the incident, locals began calling the village Kupusovići - Village of the Cabbage People.

References

Populated places in Višegrad